The 2010–11 season was FC Dinamo București's 62nd consecutive season in Liga I. Dinamo sought to win their first trophy in four seasons, but this once again proved unsuccessful. The team started well the season in Liga I, leading until the seventh day, but a run of five matches without win ended their challenge. The team came closest to silverware in the Romanian Cup, reaching the final, only to lose against its biggest rival, FC Steaua București.

Season review
Dinamo started the season with a new manager, Ioan Andone, brought back in charge after five years. The first official game was in the UEFA Europa League, against Moldavian side FC Olimpia Bălţi. Dinamo won both legs with 7–1 on aggregate. In the third preliminary round, Dinamo was beaten 4–3 on aggregate by HNK Hajduk Split from Croatia.

In the championship, Dinamo started with four wins in the first five games. But in the next five, Dinamo managed only one point, a draw against FC Brașov and could not get back on track. The team won both games against its biggest rivals, Steaua, gained four points in the games against the other rivals from Bucharest, Rapid, but failed to win against smaller teams like Astra Ploieşti, Universitatea Cluj and Pandurii Târgu Jiu. The defence was the weakest link. Dinamo ended the season with 54 goals conceded, more than 1.5 per game. They finished the season sixth thereby qualifying for the next season of Europa League.

In the Romanian Cup, Dinamo reached the final for the first time in six years. Its opponents were Steaua, and after winning both games in the championship, Dinamo failed to win the final after an own-goal from Ştefan Bărboianu.

Players

Squad changes

In:

Out:

Player statistics

Squad stats

|-
|colspan="12"|Players sold or loaned out during the season
|-

Disciplinary record

|-
|colspan="12"|Players sold or loaned out during the season
|-

Club

Technical staff

Competitions

Overall
FC Dinamo played in three competitions: Liga I, UEFA Europa League and Cupa României.

Liga I

Standings

Results summary

Results by round

Competitive

Liga I
Kickoff times are in EET.

UEFA Europa League

Results by round

Cupa României

Non competitive matches

Source

References 

2010-11
Romanian football clubs 2010–11 season